Literally is an English adverb. It has been controversially used as an intensifier for figurative statements.

History 
The first known use of the word literally was in the 15th century, or the 1530s, when it was used in the sense of "in a literal sense or manner".

The use of the word as an intensifier for figurative statements emerged later, in 1769, when Frances Brooke wrote the following sentence:

Controversy 
The use of literally as an intensifier for figurative statements has been controversial since the early 20th century, when objections first started being raised. In 1909, the following entry was included in a blacklist of literary faults:

Opponents state that this usage is contrary to its original meaning, that it is nonsensical for a word to mean two opposite things, that the use of the word literally as an intensifier can be substituted by other words ("‘absolutely", "definitely", "unquestionably") and that it makes the speaker look ridiculous. Paul Brians stated in Common Errors in English Usage: "Don’t say of someone that he ‘literally blew up’ unless he swallows a stick of dynamite."   

Proponents state that this usage has been well-attested since the 18th century. The authors of the Merriam Webster dictionary write: "The use of literally in a fashion that is hyperbolic or metaphoric is not new—evidence of this use dates back to 1769" and "the fact that so many people are writing angry letters serves as a sort of secondhand evidence, as they would hardly be complaining about this usage if it had not become common." In regards to the objection that literally has two opposite meanings, proponents state that many words are used in seemingly contradictory ways (see Auto-antonym#Examples).

In popular culture 
In 2014, CollegeHumor made a skit titled "The Boy Who Cried Literally", which parodies overuse of the word.

References 

English words
Linguistic controversies